Benalla railway station is located on the North East line in Victoria, Australia. It serves the town of Benalla, and it opened on 18 August 1873.

A goods shed and sidings are located to the west of the station, whilst a locomotive depot was formerly located to the north. A turntable remains, and, until the broad gauge was converted to standard gauge, was occasionally used by steam locomotives.

To the north of the station, the Oaklands line, towards Yarrawonga, branches off. Benalla was also the junction for the now closed Tatong line.

History

Benalla opened as the temporary terminus of the line from Violet Town, before the line was extended to Wangaratta on 28 October 1873.

The site of the station was a controversial decision at the time, guided by the 1870 flood of the Broken River to the south that engulfed the town. The railway line opened on 18 August 1873, but only temporary facilities were provided. The first permanent building, of identical design to that at Seymour, was provided in 1874. It was extended in 1888, with the addition of dining and refreshment room facilities and administrative offices, all topped by a large tower.

The bridge over the Broken River, of iron plate-girder construction, was the longest metal girder bridge in Australia at the time of construction, totalling 241.7 metres. Listed on the Victorian Heritage Register, it was the second bridge of its type built in Victoria, and the first metal railway bridge both designed and fabricated within the colony.

The Oaklands branch line to St James opened in 1883, and was extended to Yarrawonga in 1886. The goods yard was expanded for this extra traffic in 1885, with more sidings added in 1902. Around this time, the original goods shed was demolished and replaced. The Tatong branch line followed in 1913, and remained until closure in 1947.

In 1913, Benalla gained a second and third platform, these being a wide island platform, with a cantilevered verandah, located to the west of the main station building. The platforms were linked by an iron footbridge, which was provided in 1888, and was located across the station yard. The island platform was removed in 1937, leaving the main platform only. Two signal boxes were built in 1888, both being extended in 1914. Only the signal box at the Up end remains today, but is unused.

A locomotive shed was provided at Benalla early on, located at the Down end of the station yard. Of corrugated iron construction, it could house six engines. In 1899, a roundhouse shed was erected, with the old shed used for wagon repairs. In 1908, a  turntable was provided, replaced in 1953 by an electrically driven unit. Its use declined after the demise of steam locomotives, and several stalls were removed in 1960, to allow the construction of the parallel standard gauge track.

In 1961, boom barriers replaced interlocked gates at the Nunn Street level crossing, located nearby in the Up direction of the station. In 1964, a platform was provided on the standard gauge line. By 1969, the turntable was booked out of use.

In 1974, the two-storey section and tower of the 1889 station building were demolished, on the basis that the whole building was too expensive to maintain, and to provide space for a car park. The demolition was postponed several times, due to the opposition of various local groups. By late 1975, a 3t crane at the station was abolished. In 1979, an underpass was provided at the Up end of the station, to replace the footbridge that had been located at the Down end of the station.

In 1985, the former Way & Works area was replace with a new camp site. During that time, the former office and crew rooms of the locomotive depot were also demolished, and the passenger facilities in the main station building were also refurbished. On 27 April 1988, the former BP and Mobil oil sidings were abolished.

By 22 May 1990, the locomotive depot was closed. In May 1991, further alterations occurred, including the removal of a number of sidings, crossovers, disc signals and signal posts, and the sleeving of a number of levers, with further alterations occurring in July of the same year. Also during 1991, the electric staff sections Benalla - Glenrowan - Wangaratta were abolished, and were replaced with electric staff section Benalla 'B' Box - Wangaratta. A new  turntable was also provided in 1991.

The former locomotive depot was hit by a severe storm on 22 November 1994, leaving the shed damaged and destroying two Tait carriages stored inside. The shed was later demolished.

In 1998, former New South Wales regional passenger operator CountryLink rebuilt the standard gauge platform. The works included replacing the original deck with a steel deck covered with a concrete surface, refurbishing the platform shelters and providing new lighting, fencing, seating and bins.

Qube Logistics constructed an intermodal terminal in the former goods yard in late 2018, to receive containerised cement and fly ash from Sydney, for use in pre-cast panels being manufactured by Boral for the West Gate Tunnel. The first cement was delivered to the facility on 19 December of that year.

Former station Baddaginnie was located between Benalla and Violet Town, while former stations Winton and Glenrowan were located between Benalla and Wangaratta.

Platforms and services

Benalla has two side platforms. It is serviced by V/Line Albury line services, and NSW TrainLink XPT Sydney to Melbourne services.

Platform 1:
  V/Line services to Southern Cross and Albury
  XPT services to Sydney Central

Platform 2:
  XPT services to Southern Cross

Transport links

Benalla Bus Lines operates one route via Benalla station, under contract to Public Transport Victoria:
 : Benalla – Benalla East

V/Line operates road coach services from Benalla station to Shepparton, Adelaide, Milawa, Bendigo, the Bendigo Campus of La Trobe University, Seymour, Wangaratta and Albury.

References

External links

Rail Geelong gallery
Victorian Railway Stations gallery

Railway stations in Australia opened in 1873
Regional railway stations in Victoria (Australia)